Szczutowo may refer to:

Szczutowo, Brodnica County in Kuyavian-Pomeranian Voivodeship (north-central Poland)
Szczutowo, Golub-Dobrzyń County in Kuyavian-Pomeranian Voivodeship (north-central Poland)
Szczutowo, Masovian Voivodeship (east-central Poland)